Racism in Japan comprises negative attitudes and views on race or ethnicity which are related to each other, are held by various people and groups in Japan, and have been reflected in discriminatory laws, practices and actions (including violence) at various times in the history of Japan against racial or ethnic groups.

According to census statistics in 2018, 97.8% of Japan's population are Japanese, with the remainder being foreign nationals residing in Japan. The number of foreign workers has increased dramatically in recent years, due to the aging population and a shrinking labor force.  A news article in 2018 suggests that approximately 1 out of 10 people among the younger population residing in Tokyo are foreign nationals. According to the CIA World Factbook, Japanese make up 98.1% of the population, Chinese 0.5%, and Korean 0.4%, with the remaining 1% representing all other ethnic groups.

Japan lacks any law which prohibits racial, ethnic, or religious discrimination. The country also has no national human rights institutions. Non-Japanese individuals in Japan often face human rights violations that Japanese citizens may not. In recent years, non-Japanese media has reported that Japanese firms frequently confiscate the passports of guest workers in Japan, particularly unskilled laborers.  

In the early 20th century, driven by an ideology of Japanese nationalism under the guise of national unity, the Japanese government identified and forcefully assimilated marginalized populations, which included Ryukyuans, Ainu, and other underrepresented groups, imposing assimilation programs in language, culture and religion. Japan considers these ethnic groups as a mere "subgroup" of the Japanese people and therefore synonymous to the Yamato people, and do not recognize them as a minority group with a distinct culture.

Background

Demographics

About 2.2% of Japan's total legal resident population are foreign citizens. Of these, according to 2018 data from the Japanese government, the principal groups are as follows.

The above statistics do not include the approximately 30,000 U.S. military stationed in Japan, nor do they account for illegal immigrants. The statistics also do not take into account naturalized citizens from backgrounds including but not limited to Korean and Chinese, and citizen descendants of immigrants. The total legal resident population of 2012 is estimated at 127.6 million.

Racism and ethnic discrimination in Japan by target

Japanese ethnic minorities

The nine largest minority groups residing in Japan are: North and South Korean, Chinese (also Taiwanese), Brazilian (many Brazilians in Japan have Japanese ancestors), Filipinos, Vietnamese, the Ainu indigenous to Hokkaido and the Ryukyuans indigenous to Okinawa and other islands between Kyushu and Taiwan. The Burakumin, an outcast group at the bottom of Japan's feudal order, are sometimes included. There are also a number of smaller ethnic communities in Japan with a much shorter history.

According to the United Nations' 2008 Diène report, communities most affected by racism and xenophobia in Japan include:

 the national minorities of Ainu and people of Okinawa,
 people and descendants of people from neighbouring countries (Chinese and Koreans)
 and the new immigrants from other Asian, African, South American and Middle Eastern countries.

Koreans

Since the Japan–Korea Treaty of 1876 and up to World War II, Koreans sought asylum and educational opportunities that were available in Japan. In 1910, the Japan-Korean Annexation Treaty was established and it stated that Koreans would be granted Japanese citizenship by law because Korea was annexed by Japan. During World War II, the Japanese government established the National Mobilization Law, which constrained Koreans from getting jobs, which were very limited for Koreans even prior to World War II. Koreans who were not conscripted for military service were forced to work in factories and mines under inhumane conditions; an estimated 60,000 Koreans died due to harsh working conditions.

Following World War II, Koreans decided to illegally participate in the Post-World War II rebuilding of Japan because of the discrimination which they were being subjected to, both politically and economically; they were treated unfairly and paid low wages in Japan.  (resident in Japan) Koreans are permanent residents of Japan registered as Joseon or South Korean nationality. Joseon was annexed by Japan in 1910, therefore  Koreans with Joseon citizenship are de facto stateless. After World War II, 2 million Koreans living in Japan were granted a temporary Joseon nationality under the US military government (because there was no government in Korea then). However, the meaning of Joseon nationality became vague as Korea was divided by the United States and the Soviet Union, and in 1948 North and South Korea each established their own government. Some obtained South Korean citizenship later, but others who opposed the division of Korea or sympathized with North Korea maintained their Joseon nationality because people are not allowed to register North Korean nationality.

Most  came to Japan from Korea under Japanese rule between 1910 and 1945. A large proportion of this immigration is said to be the result of Korean landowners and workers losing their land and livelihood due to Japanese land and production confiscation initiatives and migrating to Japan for work. According to the calculation of Rudolph Rummel, a total of 5.4 million Koreans were also conscripted into forced labor and shipped throughout the Japanese Empire. He estimates that 60,000 Koreans died during forced labor in places such as Manchuria and Sakhalin.

During the occupation of Korea by Japan, the Japanese government enforced a policy of forced assimilation. Korean culture was repressed and the Korean language was labeled a Japanese dialect  and banned, Koreans were forced to learn how to speak Japanese and take Japanese names. However, Koreans resisted this and by the end of the 1940s, it was almost completely undone. Ethnic Koreans in Japan were massacred as scapegoats in the chaos of the Great Kanto earthquake in 1923 (Kantō Massacre). Many Korean refugees also came to the country during the Jeju uprising in the First Republic of South Korea. Though most migrants returned to Korea, GHQ estimates in 1946 indicated that 650,000 Koreans remained in Japan.

After World War II, the Korean community in Japan was split between allegiance to South Korea (Mindan) and North Korea (Chongryon). The last major wave of Korean migration to Japan started after South Korea was devastated by the Korean War in the 1950s. Most notably, the large number of refugees were from Jejuans escaping from the massacres on Jeju Island by the authoritarian South Korean government.

 who identify themselves with Chongryon are also an important money source for North Korea. One estimate suggests that the total annual transfers from Japan to North Korea may exceed US$200 million. Japanese law does not allow dual citizenship for adults over 22 and until the 1980s required adoption of a Japanese name for citizenship. Partially for this reason, many  did not obtain Japanese citizenship as they saw the process as humiliating.

Although more  are becoming Japanese citizens, issues of identity remain complicated. Even those who do not choose to become Japanese citizens often use Japanese names to avoid discrimination, and live their lives as if they were Japanese. This is in contrast with the Chinese living in Japan, who generally use their Chinese names and openly form Chinatown communities. An increase in tensions between Japan and North Korea in the late 1990s led to a surge of attacks against Chongryon, the pro-North residents' organisation, including a pattern of assaults against Korean schoolgirls in Japan. The Japanese authorities have recently started to crack down on Chongryon with investigations and arrests. These moves are often criticized by Chongryon as acts of political suppression.

When Tokyo Governor Shintaro Ishihara referred to Chinese and Koreans as sangokujin  in 2000 in the context of foreigners being a potential source of unrest in the aftermath of an earthquake, the foreign community complained. Historically, the word has often been used pejoratively and Ishihara's statement brought images of the massacre of Koreans by civilians and police alike after the 1923 Great Kantō earthquake to mind. Therefore, the use of the term in context of potential rioting by foreigners is considered by many as provocative, if not explicitly racist.

In 2014, a United States government human rights report expressed concern about the abuse and harassment directed against Korean nationals by Japanese right-wing groups such as the Uyoku dantai. In 2022, it was reported that anti-Korean racism in Japan has been on the rise, with homes burned and death threats made towards ethnic Korean communities.

Mainland Chinese

Mainland Chinese are the largest legal minority in Japan (according to the 2018 statistics as shown above). An investigator from the United Nations Commission on Human Rights (UNCHR) said, racism against Koreans and Chinese is deeply rooted in Japan because of history and culture.

Taiwanese
There are a number of Taiwanese people that reside in Japan due to Taiwan's history as being a colony of Japan from 1895 to 1945. Renhō (born Hsieh Lien-fang, the former leader of the Democratic Party, is known to be the most famous mixed Taiwanese-Japanese politician.

In 2000, the then governor of Tokyo Shintaro Ishihara insulted the Taiwanese, referring to them as Sangokujin:

I referred to the "many  who entered Japan illegally." I thought some people would not know that word so I paraphrased it and used gaikokujin, or foreigners. But it was a newspaper holiday so the news agencies consciously picked up the  part, causing the problem.

... After World War II, when Japan lost, the Chinese of Taiwanese origin and people from the Korean Peninsula persecuted, robbed, and sometimes beat up Japanese. It's at that time the word was used, so it was not derogatory. Rather we were afraid of them.

... There's no need for an apology. I was surprised that there was a big reaction to my speech. In order not to cause any misunderstanding, I decided I will no longer use that word. It is regrettable that the word was interpreted in the way it was."

Ainu

The Ainu people of Japan are considered to be the aboriginals of Northern Japan; during the Meiji period, they were considered 'former aboriginals.' The native group of Japan, namely the Ainu, are a group estimated to be 25,000 of the entire population in Japan. They have maintained their language of Ainu among 15 families. Although the population of Ainu people in Japan is officially recorded as 25,000, the actual population is thought of to be of a higher number: 150,000. Many genetically Ainu individuals don't identify as Ainu or they identify as Japanese in order to avoid discrimination within society, the workplace, and educational institutions. As of 2019, the Ainu people are now officially recognized as indigenous people of Japan. The Ainu are an indigenous group mainly living in Hokkaidō, with some also living in modern-day Russia. At present, the official Japanese government estimate of the population is 25,000, though this number has been disputed with unofficial estimates of upwards of 200,000.

For much of Japanese history, the Ainu were the main inhabitants of Hokkaido. However, as a result of Japanese migration into the island after 1869, the Ainu were largely displaced and assimilated. Due to Meiji era policies, the Ainu were evicted from their traditional homelands and their cultural practices were outlawed. Official recognition of the Ainu as an indigenous group occurred over a century later on June 6, 2008, as a result of a resolution passed by the government of Japan, which recognized both their cultural differences and their past struggles.

Ryukyuan

The Ryukyuan people lived in an independent kingdom until it became a vassal of Japan's Satsuma Domain in 1609. The kingdom, however, retained a degree of autonomy until 1879 when the islands were officially annexed by Japan as Okinawa Prefecture. They are now Japan's largest minority group, with 1.3 million living in Okinawa and 300,000 living in other areas of Japan.

The Okinawan language, the most widely spoken Ryukyuan language, is related to Japanese, the two being in the Japonic languages. Ryukyuan languages were heavily suppressed through a policy of forced assimilation throughout the former Ryukyu Kingdom after it was annexed in 1879. With only Japanese taught in schools and students punished for speaking or writing their native language through the use of dialect cards, the younger generations of Ryukyuans began to give up their "backwards" culture for that of Japan. The Japanese government officially labels the Ryukyuan languages as dialects (Hōgen) of Japanese, although they are not mutually intelligible with one another, or even between each other. In 1940, there was a political debate amongst Japanese leaders about whether or not to continue the oppression of the Ryukyuan languages, although the argument for assimilation prevailed. Japanese soldiers outright shot people who spoke Ryukyuan languages during the Battle of Okinawa, believing they were spies. There are still some children learning Ryukyuan languages natively, but this is rare, especially on mainland Okinawa. The language still is used in traditional cultural activities, such as folk music, or folk dance.

After the annexation of the islands, many Ryukyuans, especially Okinawans, migrated to the mainland to find jobs or better living conditions. They were sometimes met with discrimination, such as workplaces with signs that read, "No Ryukyuans or Koreans." At the 1903 Osaka Exhibition, an exhibit called the "Pavilion of the World" (Jinruikan) had actual Okinawans, Ainu, Koreans, and other "backwards" peoples on display in their native clothes and housing. During the fierce fighting in the Battle of Okinawa, Japanese soldiers committed multiple atrocities against Okinawan civilians, including rape and murder, using them as human shields, and forcing them to commit suicide. In 2007, the Ministry of Education attempted to revise school textbooks to lessen mention of these atrocities, but was met with massive demonstrations in Okinawa.

Culturally, Okinawa throughout its history had been closer to southern China, Taiwan, and Southeast Asia as compared to Japan, reflecting its long history of trade with these regions. However, because of the standard use of Japanese in schools, television, and all print media in Okinawa, these cultural differences are often glossed over in Japanese society. Consequently, many Japanese consider Okinawans to be Japanese, sometimes ignoring their distinct cultural and historical heritage in insensitive ways.

Other groups

Western foreigners in Japan, particularly those from North America, Europe, Australia and New Zealand, are often called   or  Gaijin (outsider or alien).  The first large influx of such foreigners occurred in the 1980s, when the Japanese government adopted a policy to give scholarships to large numbers of foreign students to study at Japanese universities.

In addition, as the Japanese economy grew quickly in the 1980s, a sizable number of Westerners began coming to Japan. Many found jobs as English conversation teachers, but others were employed in various professional fields such as finance and business. Although some have become permanent residents or even naturalized citizens, they are generally perceived as short-term visitors and treated as outsiders of Japanese society.

During the 1980s and 1990s, the Keidanren business lobbying organization advocated a policy of allowing South Americans of Japanese ancestry (mainly Brazilians and Peruvians) to work in Japan, as Japan's industries faced a major labor shortage. Although this policy has been decelerated in recent years, many of these individuals continue to live in Japan, some in ethnic enclaves near their workplaces.

Many people from Southeast Asia (particularly Vietnam and the Philippines) and Southwest Asia (and Iran) also entered Japan during this time, making foreigners as a group a more visible minority in Japan. The TBS television series Smile is about Bito Hayakawa who was born to a Japanese mother and Filipino father, and struggled to overcome the difficulties faced as a mixed race child.

The main concerns of the latter groups are often related to their legal status, a public perception of criminal activity, and general discrimination associated with being non-Japanese.

South Sakhalin, which was once part of Japan as Karafuto Prefecture, had indigenous populations of Nivkhs and Uilta (Orok). Like the Karafuto Koreans but unlike the Ainu, they were thus not included in the evacuation of Japanese nationals after the Soviet invasion in 1945. Some Nivkhs and Uilta who served in the Imperial Japanese Army were held in Soviet work camps; after court cases in the late 1950s and 1960s, they were recognised as Japanese nationals and thus permitted to migrate to Japan. Most settled around Abashiri, Hokkaidō. The  was founded to fight for Uilta rights and the preservation of Uilta traditions in 1975 by Dahinien Gendānu.

The Ōbeikei, living in the Bonin Islands, have a varied ethnic background including European, Micronesian and Kanak.

Although protection and refugee status has been granted to those seeking asylum from Myanmar, the same has not been offered to refugee Kurds in Japan from Turkey. Without this protection and status, these Kurds who have fled from Turkey due to persecution are generally living in destitution, with no education and having no legal residency status. A clash took place outside the Turkish embassy in Tokyo in October 2015 between Kurds and Turks in Japan which began after a Kurdish party flag was shown at the embassy.  

The Burakumin group within Japan is ethnically Japanese; however, they are considered of lower status and lower class standing in comparison to other ethnicities in Japan. They worked as primarily farmers and were considered peasants on the social hierarchy pyramid. Post-World War, the Burakumin group was heavily dissociated from society as the abolishment of the feudal caste system did not put an end to the social discrimination that they faced within restricting housing systems; movements and protests have been maintained throughout the years as they fight to receive and equal status as their peers in regard to access to certain educational, housing, and social benefits and citizenship rights. In order to gain attention to the problems and injustices that they experience, groups such as the militant style, Buraka Liberation League, which uses presentations and speaking to prove and explain their frustrations to a panel.

Representation of black people in Japanese media, such as anime, has been subject to criticism.

Racism and ethnic discrimination in Japan by field

Higher learning
Although foreign professors teach throughout the Japanese higher education system, Robert J. Geller of University of Tokyo reported, in 1992, that it was extremely rare for them to be given tenure.

Non-Japanese citizens and crimes

As in other countries, foreigners sometimes do work that is not allowed by their visas, or overstay the terms of their visas. Their employment tends to be concentrated in fields where most Japanese are not able to or no longer wish to work.

The Yakuza or Japanese organized crime has made use of Chinese immigrants in Japan as henchmen to commit crimes, which have led to a negative public perception.
In 2003, foreigners from Africa were responsible for 2.8 times as much crime per capita as Japanese natives but were slightly less likely to commit violent crime.

According to National Police Authority records, in 2002, 16,212 foreigners were caught committing 34,746 crimes, over half of which turned out to be visa violations (residing/working in Japan without a valid visa). The statistics show that 12,667 cases (36.5%) and 6,487 individuals (40.0%) were Chinese, 5,272 cases (15.72%) and 1,186 individuals (7.3%) were Brazilian, and 2,815 cases (8.1%) and 1,738 individuals (10.7%) were Korean. The total number of crimes committed in the same year by Japanese was 546,934 cases.

Within these statistics, Japanese committed 6,925 violent crimes, of which 2,531 were arson or rape, while foreigners committed 323 violent crimes, but only 42 cases are classified as arson or rape. Foreigners were more likely to commit crimes in groups: About 61.5% of crimes committed by foreigners had one or more accomplice, while only 18.6% of crimes committed by Japanese were in groups. Japanese commit more violent crimes than foreigners. 

By a 2010 study by the National Police Agency illegal residents decreased from 219,000 in 2004 to 113,000 in 2008, and in addition, the number of arrested foreign visitors decreased from 21,842 in 2004 to 13,880 in 2008. The percentage of foreign nationals in all arrestees charged in penal code crimes was about 2.0% and this number has remained relatively stable. While the percentage of foreign nationals among all arrestees charged in cases involving robbery or burglary was around 5.5% in 2008.

The former head of the Tokyo Metropolitan Government's Emergency Public Safety Task Force, Hiroshi Kubo, published a book called  (in English: Is Public Safety Really Deteriorating?) disputing foreign crime statistics, suggesting that such statistics were being manipulated by politicians for political gain. He suggested, for example, that including visa violations in crime statistics is misleading. He also said that the crime rate in Tokyo is based on reported rather than actual crimes.

Access to housing and other services
A significant number of apartments, and some motels, night clubs, brothels, sex parlours and public baths in Japan have put up signs stating that foreigners are not allowed, or that they must be accompanied by a Japanese person to enter.

In February 2002 plaintiffs sued a Hokkaido bathhouse in district court pleading racial discrimination, and on November 11 the Sapporo District Court ordered the bathhouse to pay the plaintiffs ¥1 million each in damages.

In fact, there were a substantial number of lawsuits regarding discrimination against foreigners. For example, in 2005, a Korean woman who attempted to rent a room was refused because she was not a Japanese citizen. She filed a discrimination lawsuit, and she won in Japanese court.

"Discrimination toward foreign nationals in their searches for homes continues to be one of the biggest problems", said the head of the Ethnic Media Press Centre. Organizers of the service said they hope to eradicate the racism that prevents foreigners, particularly Non-Westerners, from renting apartments since there are currently no laws in Japan that ban discrimination.

During the COVID-19 pandemic, many establishments started to exclude non-Japanese customers over fears that they would spread the coronavirus. For example, a ramen shop owner imposed a rule prohibiting non-Japanese people from entering the restaurant.

Healthcare 
Japan provides universal health insurance for all citizens. Foreigners staying in Japan for a year or more are required to enroll for one of the public health insurance schemes. However, before this policy was mandated, many foreign workers, particularly Japanese Brazilians, were less likely to be covered by health insurance due to refusal of the employer.

Initially, many prefectures refused to allow foreigners from entering the National Health Insurance (Kokumin Kenkou Hoken) as foreigners were not considered to be eligible. The policy was revised to include foreigners after local governments witnessed healthcare disparities between Japanese citizens and foreigners. A study conducted revealed that incidences of increased poor health was high among the foreign workers living in the Tochigi Prefecture. A quarter of these workers did not visit clinics or hospitals, due to language barriers and high medical costs. Nearly 60% of the 317 workers surveyed experienced difficulty in communicating in English.

Some hospitals have been known to turn patients away if they could not confirm their residence status. The NTT Medical Center Tokyo, located in the Gotanda district of Tokyo, announced on their website that foreigners must present their insurance card and residence cards. If they were unable to then they would be denied service, with the exception of emergency cases. A maternity ward, located in Tokyo, had stated on their website that services would be limited for patients who could only speak at a conversational level in Japanese.

During the COVID-19 pandemic, many ethnic-minority healthcare providers have been found to not be assigned to treating patients with the COVID-19 infection. Possible reasons for this include the low number of ethnic-minority healthcare providers working in Japan's clinics and hospitals, as well as language barriers.

History

Pre-war xenophobia
Racial discrimination against other Asians was habitual in Imperial Japan, having begun with the start of Japanese colonialism. The Meiji era Japanese showed a contempt for other Asians. This was exemplified in an editorial titled Datsu-A Ron, which advocated that Japan treat other Asians as other western empires treat them. The Shōwa regime preached racial superiority and racialist theories, based on nature of Yamato-damashii. According to historian Kurakichi Shiratori, one of Emperor Hirohito's teachers: "Therefore nothing in the world compares to the divine nature of the imperial house and likewise the majesty  of our national polity (kokutai). Here is one great reason for Japan's superiority."

As stated in An Investigation of Global Policy with the Yamato Race as Nucleus, a classified report which was published by the Ministry of Health, Labour and Welfare on July 1, 1943, just as a family has harmony and reciprocity, but with a clear-cut hierarchy, the Japanese, as a racially superior people, are destined to rule Asia "eternally" as the head of the family of Asian nations. The most horrific xenophobia of the pre-Shōwa period was displayed after the 1923 Great Kantō earthquake, where in the confusion after a massive earthquake, Koreans were wrongly maligned as poisoning the water supply. A vicious pogrom resulted in the deaths of at least 3,000 Koreans, and the imprisonment of 26,000.

In the 1930s, the number of attacks on Westerners and their Japanese friends by nationalist citizens increased due to the influence of Japanese military-political doctrines in the early years of the Showa period, these attacks occurred after a long build-up which started in the Meiji period, when a few samurai die-hards refused to accept foreigners in Japan.  For an exception, see Jewish settlement in the Japanese Empire.

World War II
Racism was omnipresent in the press during the Second Sino-Japanese War and the Greater East Asia War and the media's descriptions of the superiority of the Yamato people was unwaveringly consistent. Initially, in order to justify Japan's conquest of Asia, Japanese propaganda espoused the ideas of Japanese supremacy by claiming that the Japanese represented a combination of all Asian peoples and cultures, emphasizing heterogeneous traits. Japanese propaganda started to place an emphasis on the ideas of racial purity and the supremacy of the Yamato race when the Second Sino-Japanese War intensified.

Mostly after the launching of the Pacific War, Westerners were detained by official authorities, and on occasion were objects of violent assaults, sent to police jails or military detention centers or suffered bad treatment in the street. This applied particularly to Americans, Soviets and British; in Manchukuo at the same period xenophobic attacks were carried out against Chinese and other non-Japanese.

At the end of World War II, the Japanese government continued to adhere to the notion of racial homogeneity and racial supremacy, with the Yamato race at the top of the racial hierarchy. Japanese propaganda of racial purity returned to post-World War II Japan because of the support of the Allied forces. U.S. policy in Japan terminated the purge of high-ranking fascist war criminals and reinstalled the leaders who were responsible for the creation and manifestation of prewar race propaganda. 

Similar to what would occur in Korea, the overwhelming presence of American soldiers, most of whom young and unmarried, had a noticeable effect on the Japanese female populus. The obvious power dynamic after the war outcome, as well as the lack of accountability for American soldiers who impregnated Japanese women, placed these children into a negative light before their lives even began. An unknown indeterminate number of these children would be abandoned by their fathers. They would grow up associated with defeat and death in their own country and regarded as a reminder of Japanese subordination to a western power.

Post-war government policy

Because of the low importance placed on assimilating minorities in Japan, laws regarding ethnic matters receive low priority in the legislative process. Still, in 1997, "Ainu cultural revival" legislation was passed which replaced the previous "Hokkaido Former Aboriginal Protection" legislation that had devastating effects on the Ainu in the past.

Article 14 of the Constitution of Japan states that all people (English version) or citizens (revised Japanese version) are equal under the law, and they cannot be discriminated against politically, economically, or socially on the basis of race, belief, sex, or social or other background.

However, Japan does not have civil rights legislation which prohibits or penalizes discriminatory activities committed by citizens, businesses, or non-governmental organizations.

Attempts have been made in the Diet to enact human rights legislation. In 2002, a draft was submitted to the House of Representatives, but did not reach a vote. Had the law passed, it would have set up a Human Rights Commission to investigate, name and shame, or financially penalize discriminatory practices as well as hate speech committed by private citizens or establishments.

Another issue which has been publicly debated but has not received much legislative attention is whether to allow permanent residents to vote in local legislatures.  organizations affiliated with North Korea are against this initiative, while  organizations affiliated with South Korea support it.

Finally, there is debate about altering requirements for work permits to foreigners. As of 2022, the Japanese government does not issue work permits unless it can be demonstrated that the person has certain skills which cannot be provided by locals.

Comment by U.N. special rapporteur on racism and xenophobia
In July 2005, a United Nations special rapporteur on racism and xenophobia expressed concerns about deep and profound racism in Japan and insufficient government recognition of the problem.

Doudou Diène (Special Rapporteur of the UN Commission on Human Rights) concluded after an investigation and nine-day tour of Japan that racial discrimination and xenophobia in Japan primarily affects three groups: national minorities, descendants of former Japanese colonies, and foreigners from other Asian countries. Professor John Lie, from the University of California, Berkeley, in spite of the widespread belief that Japan is ethnically homogeneous, believes it is more accurate to describe Japan as a multiethnic society. Such claims have long been rejected by other sectors of Japanese society such as former Japanese Prime Minister Tarō Asō, who has once described Japan as being a nation of "one race, one civilization, one language and one culture".

Sankei Shimbun, a Japanese national newspaper, while expressing a support for combating discrimination, expressed doubt on the impartiality of the report, pointing out that Doudou Diène never visited Japan before and his short tour was arranged by a Japanese NGO, IMADR (International Movement Against All Forms of Discrimination). The chairman of the organization is Professor Kinhide Mushakoji, who is a board member (and the former director of the board) of the International Institute of the Juche Idea (主体思想国際研究所), an organization whose stated purpose is to propagate Juche, the official ideology of North Korea.

In 2010, according to the UN Committee on the Elimination of Racial Discrimination, Japan's record on racism has improved, but there is still room for progress. The committee was critical of the lack of anti-hate speech legislation in the country and the treatment of Japanese minorities and its large Korean and Chinese communities. The Japan Times quoted committee member Regis de Gouttes as saying that there had been little progress since 2001 (when the last review was held) "There is no new legislation, even though in 2001 the committee said prohibiting hate speech is compatible with freedom of expression." Many members of the committee, however, praised the Japanese government's recent recognition of the Ainu as an indigenous people.

In February 2015, Ayako Sono, a former member of an education reform panel, wrote a controversial column in Sankei Shimbun suggesting that more foreign workers be imported to meet labor shortages, but that they be separated from native Japanese in a system of apartheid. She later explained "I have never commended apartheid, but I do think that the existence of a ‘Chinatown’ or ‘Little Tokyo’ is a good thing."

See also

 An Investigation of Global Policy with the Yamato Race as Nucleus
 Anti-Russian sentiment in Japan
 Antisemitism in Japan
 Eugenics in Japan
 Hakko ichiu
 Japanese nationalism
 Japanese war crimes
 Statism in Showa Japan
 Manga Kenkanryu
 Nippon Kaigi
 Gaijin
 Shina (word)
 Tohokai – a Japanese fascist political party which advocated Nazism 
 Uyoku dantai
 Zaitokukai
 Kikokushijo returned children
 Geography of antisemitism
 Racism by country
 Fascism in Asia
 Racism in Asia

Notes

References

Bibliography

日本 戸口調査, 166-1875." Images. FamilySearch. http://FamilySearch.org : 14 June 2016. Ehime Prefecture Library, Matsuyama. Kyushu Historical Museum, Ogōri. Nara Prefecture Library.
Japan Statistics Bureau Archived December 25, 2007, at the Wayback Machine, accessed December 8, 2007
Central Intelligence Agency. (2016). Japan. In The world factbook. Retrieved from [https://www.cia.gov/the-world-factbook/countries/japan/ The World Factbook] 4. Masami Ito (12 May 2009). "Between a rock and a hard place". The Japan Times. Retrieved 5 February 2017.
Disturbing trend: Japanese protesters use Nazism to attack Chinese, Koreans". AJW by The Asahi Shimbun. Archived from the original on October 13, 2014. Retrieved October 13, 2014.
Hohmann, S. (2008). "The Ainu's modern struggle". World Watch. 21 (6): 20–24.
 "Ainu". omniglot.com. 2009. Archived from the original on January 2, 2010. Retrieved August 2, 2009.
Lewallen (2016). The fabric of indigeneity : Ainu identity, gender, and settler colonialism in Japan. Albuquerque: University of New Mexico Press. pp. 131–142. .
 Tamura, Toshiyuki. "The Status and Role of Ethnic Koreans in the Japanese Economy" (PDF). Institute for International Economics. Retrieved November 19, 2017.
 OBA, Yoshio. "On Business History of Hokkaido Coal Mining and Shipping Corporation(3)". Hokkai-Gakuen Organization of Knowledge Ubiquitous through Gaining Archives. Retrieved October 6, 2020.
 Buraku Mondai in Japan: Historical and Modern Perspectives and Directions for the Future - Emily A. Su-lan Reber
 Tsutsui, Kiyoteru (2018-08-03). Rights Make Might: Global Human Rights and Minority Social Movements in Japan.

External links
Report by the UN Special Rapporteur on Contemporary forms of racism, racial discrimination, xenophobia and related intolerance on his visit to Japan, 2006 (E/CN.4/2006/16/Add.2)
CERD Concluding observations on Japan, 2010
Broadcast and Human Rights/Other Related Rights Organization
The Civil Liberties Bureau
Movements carried on by Zainichi Korean (English)
Online Newspaper covering Zainichi Korean and Mindan (English)
Portal for 100-20 years of immigration between Japan and Brazil, Covering Dekasegi and their issues, Rare pictures
Zainichi (Koreans in Japan) (English)

 
Human rights abuses in Japan
Society of Japan
Japan
Ethnic groups in Japan
Ethnicity in politics